Kalán may refer to:

 Călan, a town in Romania
 Kalán from the kindred Bár-Kalán, medieval Hungarian nobleman